Agustín Miranda may refer to:

 Agustín Miranda (footballer, born 1930), Paraguayan football defender
 Agustín Miranda (footballer, born 1992), Uruguayan football midfielder